, formerly known as Koromo, is a city in Aichi Prefecture, Japan. , the city had an estimated population of 426,162 and a population density of 464 people per km2. It is located about 35 minutes from Nagoya by way of the Meitetsu Toyota Line.

Several of Toyota Motor Corporation's manufacturing plants, including the Tsutsumi plant, are located here. The city's flag (and seal), is a unicursal hexagram.

Geography
Toyota is located in north-central Aichi Prefecture, and is the largest city in the prefecture in terms of area. The city area is mountainous to the north, with peaks averaging around 1000 feet (328 m) in height along its northern border with Nagano and Gifu Prefectures. Much of the mountainous northern portion of the city is within the Aichi Kōgen Quasi-National Park.

Toyota is within a two-hour drive of Nagoya.

Climate
The city has a climate characterized by hot and humid summers, and relatively mild winters (Köppen climate classification, Cfa).

Demographics

Per Japanese census data, the population of Toyota has been increasing over the past 50 years.

Surrounding municipalities
Aichi Prefecture
Anjō
Okazaki
Kariya
Shinshiro
Seto
Chiryu
Nisshin
Nagakute
Miyoshi
Shitara
Gifu Prefecture
Toki
Mizunami
Ena
Nagano Prefecture
Neba

City scape

History

Origins
The area of present-day Toyota City has been inhabited since prehistoric times, and archaeologists have found a continuous record of artifacts from the Japanese paleolithic period onwards.
In early proto-historic times, the area was under the control of the Mononobe clan, who built numerous kofun burial mounds. The local place name "Koromo" is mentioned in the Kojiki and other early Japanese documents.

Edo period 
During the Edo period, parts of the area of the current city were under the control of Koromo Domain, a feudal han under the Tokugawa shogunate; however, most of the area of the current city was tenryō territory controlled directly by the government in Edo and administered through hatamoto class appointed administrators. The village of "Matsudaira", from which Tokugawa Ieyasu took his clan name, was located within what is now the city of Toyota.

Meiji period
After the Meiji restoration, the area was organized into the towns of Asuke and Koromo and numerous villages under Higashikamo District and Nishikamo District with the establishment of the modern municipalities system.

The area was a major producer of silk and prospered from the Meiji period through the Taishō periods. As the demand for raw silk declined in Japan and abroad, Koromo entered a period of gradual decline after 1930. The decline encouraged Kiichiro Toyoda, cousin of Eiji Toyoda, to look for alternatives to the family's automatic loom manufacturing business. The search led to the founding of what became the Toyota Motor Corporation. Toyota built the first manufacturing facility, known as Toyota Honsha plant in November 1938, breaking ground in December 1935.

Modern history
On March 1, 1951, Koromo gained city status, and absorbed the village of Takahashi from Nishikamo District on September 30, 1956. Due to the fame and economic importance of its major employer, the city of  changed its name to Toyota on January 1, 1959.

Toyota became a sister city with Detroit, Michigan, United States in 1960. It continued to expand by annexing the towns of Kamigo (Hekikai District) on March 1, 1964, and Takaoka (Hekikai District) on September 1, 1965, and Sanage (Nishikamo District) on April 1, 1967, as well as the village of Matsudaira (Higashikamo District) on April 1, 1970.

In 1979 the Nagoya Railroad (Meitetsu) opened the Toyota New Line (now Toyota Line), and in 1988: The Aichi Loop Line was opened, thus considerably improving access to the city via rail transport.

Toyota became a Core City in 1998, with increased local autonomy.

On March 25, 2005, Expo 2005 opened with its main site in Nagakute and additional activity in Seto and Toyota. The Expo continued until September 25, 2005.

On April 1, 2005, Toyota absorbed the town of Fujioka, and the village of Obara (both from Nishikamo District), the towns of Asuke, Asahi and Inabu, and the village of Shimoyama (all from Higashikamo District) to create the new and expanded city of Toyota.

Mitsuru Obe and Eric Pfanner of The Wall Street Journal stated that by 2015 Toyota was recovering from an economic depression "so deep that some were comparing it to Detroit."

Government

Mayor-council
Toyota has a mayor-council form of government with a directly elected mayor and a unicameral city legislature of 45 members.

Prefectural Assembly
The city contributes five members to the Aichi Prefectural Assembly.

House of Representatives
In terms of national politics, the city is divided between Aichi District 11 and Aichi District 14 of the lower house of the Diet of Japan.

Public

Police
Aichi Prefectural Police
Asuke police station
Toyota police station

Firefighting
Fire department
Toyota-Kita fire department
Toyota-Minami fire department
Toyota-naka fire department
Asuke fire department

Health care
Hospital
Asuke Hospital
Toyota Kosei Hospital
TOYOTA Memorial Hospital

Post office
Toyota Post office

Library
Toyota City Library

External relations

Twin towns – Sister cities

International
Sister City
Detroit（Michigan, United States）
Since September 21, 1960
Derby（England, United Kingdom）
Since November 16, 1998
South Derbyshire（England, United Kingdom）
Since November 16, 1998

Economy

Primary sector of the economy
Agriculture
Peach
Pyrus pyrifolia（Atago）
Forestry
Cryptomeria
Chamaecyparis obtusa

Secondary sector of the economy
The main headquarters of Toyota is located in a 14-story building in Toyota. As of 2006 the head office has the "Toyopet" Toyota logo and the words "Toyota Motor". The Toyota Technical Center, a 14-story building, and the original Honsha plant, Toyota's first plant engaging in mass production and formerly named the Koromo plant, are adjacent to one another in a location near the headquarters. Vinod Jacob from The Hindu described the main headquarters building as "modest". In 2013 company head Akio Toyoda reported that it had difficulties retaining foreign employees at the headquarters due to the lack of amenities in Toyota.

Tertiary sector of the economy
Shopping center
Æon Toyota
Æon Takahashi（GREEN CITY）
KiTARA
Lut's
Meglia
T-FACE

Education

Colleges and universities
Aichi Gakusen University
Aichi Institute of Technology
Toyota National College of Technology
Aichi Mizuho College
Ohkagakuen University – Toyota campus
Chukyo University – Toyota campus
Japanese Red Cross Toyota College of Nursing
Junior College of Toyota (1990–1999)

Primary and secondary education
Toyota has 78 public elementary schools and 27 public middle schools operated by the city government and 12 public high schools operated by the Aichi Prefectural Board of Education. There are also two private middle schools and eight private high schools. The prefecture also operates two special education schools for the disabled.

International schools
 Escola Alegria de Saber – Brazilian school
 Escola NECTAR – Brazilian primary school
 Escola Pintando o Sete – Brazilian primary school

Transportation
Toyota, as the home city of Toyota Motor Corporation is well-served by expressways and national highways. However, it was the largest city in Japan which was not served by the Japanese National Railways (JNR) during its existence. The closest Shinkansen station is Mikawa-Anjō Station in the city of Anjō, although the limited-stop Nozomi and Hikari services do not stop there.

Railways

Conventional lines
Meitetsu
Toyota Line： –  –  
Mikawa Line： –  –  –  –  –  –  –  –  – 
Aichi Loop Railway
Aichi Loop Line： –  –  –  –  –  –  –  –  –  –   – 
Linimo
Aichi High-Speed Transit： –

Roads

Expressways
 Tōmei Expressway
 Shin-Tōmei Expressway
 Isewangan Expressway
 Tōkai-Kanjō Expressway

Japan National Route

Local attractions
Asuke area (Groups of Traditional Buildings)
Toyota Municipal Museum of Art
Toyota Automobile Museum
Toyota Kaikan Exhibition Hall
Toyota Kuragaike Commemorative Hall
Kampachi Gorge
Kōrankei Gorge
Kuragaike park
Obara shikizakura
The ruins of Matsudaira

Culture

Sports

Sports Team

Sports Facilities
Sky Hall Toyota
Toyota Athletic Stadium
Toyota Sports Center
Toyota Stadium

Notable people from Toyota

Suzuki Shōsan, Edo period Zen prelate
Yoshio Markino, artist, author
Miliyah Kato, singer
Masami Mitsuoka, singer
Etsuko Nishio, singer, actress
Katsuaki Watanabe, former president of Toyota Motors 
Tadashi Sugiura, professional baseball player
Masato Naito, Olympic hurdler

References

External links

  

 
Cities in Aichi Prefecture